The Hermitage, located in Ho-Ho-Kus, Bergen County, New Jersey, United States, is a fourteen-room Gothic Revival house museum built in 1847–48 from designs by William H. Ranlett for Elijah Rosencrantz, Jr. Members of the Rosencrantz family owned The Hermitage estate from 1807 to 1970. The site was designated a National Historic Landmark for the excellence of its architecture and added to National Register of Historic Places in 1970. In 1971 it was added to the New Jersey Register of Historic Places.

History
In 1767, the original colonial estate was purchased by Ann Bartow DeVisme who moved to Ho-Ho-Kus from Manhattan with five children.  One of Ann's daughters, Theodosia Bartow Prevost, and her husband James Marcus Prevost, occupied another house on the property, downhill from the present structure, nearer to the mill ponds. During the American Revolutionary War, while Major (later Lieutenant Colonel) Prevost was fighting for the British in Georgia and South Carolina, the women and children were left alone in Ho-Ho-Kus.

In July 1778, word reached Theodosia that George Washington and his troops would be passing through Ho-Ho-Kus on their way from the recent battle at Monmouth Courthouse to White Plains in Westchester County, New York. When the General and his entourage stopped at a local house, Theodosia sent an invitation to Washington for him and his men to come and stay at The Hermitage.

Visitors to the house during the Revolution included James Monroe, William Paterson, the Marquis de Lafayette, Alexander Hamilton, Lord Stirling and Aaron Burr. In 1782, after her husband was killed during the War, Theodosia Prevost married Aaron Burr at The Hermitage. For a period of time they lived in a small house adjacent to The Hermitage.

Infrastructure

In 1847, the house was remodeled in the Gothic Revival style by architect William H. Ranlett. The stone house was originally built in a Dutch-American tradition.

The large house consisted of wood-shingled roofs and pointed gables, allowing the classical music that played to be enjoyed along with the beautiful architecture. One can find a large cedar barn as well.

The Hermitage is owned by the State of New Jersey and is a museum, open to the public year-round, financed and operated by The Friends of the Hermitage, Inc., a non-profit organization. The home and land were willed by Mary Elizabeth to the State of New Jersey.

Today, The Hermitage represents Bergen County's first National Historical Landmark.

See also 

 National Register of Historic Places listings in Bergen County, New Jersey
 List of museums in New Jersey

References

External links

 The Hermitage website

Houses on the National Register of Historic Places in New Jersey
National Historic Landmarks in New Jersey
Houses completed in 1848
Historic house museums in New Jersey
Ho-Ho-Kus, New Jersey
Museums in Bergen County, New Jersey
Gothic Revival architecture in New Jersey
National Register of Historic Places in Bergen County, New Jersey
Houses in Bergen County, New Jersey
New Jersey Register of Historic Places